A portmanteau is a piece of luggage, usually made of leather and opening into two equal parts. Some are large, upright, and hinged at the back and enable hanging up clothes in one half, while others are much smaller bags (such as Gladstone bags) with two equally sized compartments.  

The word derives from the French word portemanteau (from porter, "to carry", and manteau, "coat") which nowadays means a coat rack but was in the past also used to refer to a traveling case or bag for clothes.

References

External links 
 

Luggage